C2K (formerly known as Classroom 2000) is a Northern Ireland-wide information and communications network operated on behalf of the Education Authority in the province. After the separation of the education and library boards the C2k project has been overseen by the Education Authority Northern Ireland. Since its creation the project has been funded by the European Union, through its Building Sustainable Prosperity programme, and the Department of Education. The C2k contract is currently fulfilled by Capita Technology and Software Solutions. 

C2k is responsible for providing all schools in Northern Ireland with internet and other services to support the Northern Irish Curriculum.

Some schools use their own systems, called School or Legacy.

Over the next few years, it will be replaced with EdIS (Education Information Solutions).

References

External links 
C2k - Official website
C2k Partners - Organisations and companies responsible for delivering the service.
Slemish College - an example of a C2k hosted website

Educational organisations based in Northern Ireland
Information technology organisations based in the United Kingdom